Craig Hammack is an American special effects supervisor known for his works in Disney's visual effects company Industrial Light & Magic (ILM). Hammack has worked as a technical director, digital effects artist and VFX supervisor in films, Titanic (1997), Pearl Harbor (2001), Star Wars: Episode III – Revenge of the Sith (2005), Indiana Jones and the Kingdom of the Crystal Skull (2008), Star Trek (2009), Red Tails (2012), Tomorrowland (2015), Deepwater Horizon (2016), and Black Panther (2017).

For Deepwater Horizon, he received critical acclaim and an Academy Award for Best Visual Effects nomination at 89th Academy Awards.

References

External links
 Craig Hammack at ILM
 

Industrial Light & Magic people
Special effects people
Living people
Best Visual Effects BAFTA Award winners
Year of birth missing (living people)